Scaruffi is an Italian surname. Notable people with the surname include:

 Gasparo Scaruffi (1519–1584), Italian economist
 Piero Scaruffi (born 1955), Italian-American software consultant, university lecturer, and writer

Italian-language surnames